The Never Ending Tour is the popular name for Bob Dylan's endless touring schedule since June 7, 1988.

Background
On the first year of the tour he performed 71 concerts. This is the 2nd fewest performances on a 'Never Ending Tour' yearly tour.The 1988 tour stayed within North America, performing 63 concerts in the United States and 8 in Canada. He performed in 29 states in the US and 6 provinces in Canada.

Set list
This set list is representative of the performance on October 16, 1988 in New York City. It does not represent the set list at all concerts for the duration of the tour.

"Subterranean Homesick Blues"
"I'll Remember You"
"John Brown"
"Stuck Inside of Mobile with the Memphis Blues Again
"Simple Twist of Fate"
"Bob Dylan's 115th Dream"
"Highway 61 Revisited"
"Gates of Eden"
"With God on Our Side"
"One Too Many Mornings"
"Silvio"
"In the Garden"
"Like a Rolling Stone"
Encore
"The Wagoner's Lad"
"The Times They Are a-Changin'"
"All Along the Watchtower"

Tour dates

Personnel
Bob Dylan: Vocals, guitar and harmonica
G. E. Smith: Guitar and backing vocals
Kenny Aaronson: Bass
Chris Parker: Drums

Notes

References

External links
BobLinks – Comprehensive log of concerts and set lists
Bjorner's Still on the Road – Information on recording sessions and performances

Bob Dylan concert tours
1988 concert tours